Matúš Kira (born 10 October 1994) is a Slovak professional footballer who currently plays for Košice as a goalkeeper.

Kira won the 2014–15 DOXXbet liga with the Zemplín Michalovce.

Club career
Kira was born in Košice, Slovakia. He made his Fortuna Liga debut for Zemplín Michalovce against AS Trenčín on 18 July 2015, conceding the sole goal of the game from Ryan Koolwijk.

References

External links
 MFK Zemplín Michalovce official profile
 Futbalnet profile
 

1994 births
Living people
Sportspeople from Košice
Slovak footballers
Slovakia under-21 international footballers
Association football goalkeepers
MFK Zemplín Michalovce players
FC Lokomotíva Košice players
FC Košice (2018) players
FC ViOn Zlaté Moravce players
Slovak Super Liga players
2. Liga (Slovakia) players